CODE_n is a business started in 2011 by GFT Technologies AG under the direction of CEO Ulrich Dietz. The company runs an annual contest for startups with business models based on digital technologies for five days at the CeBIT exhibition. Additionally, they have workspaces and other events that are intended to help bring together startups and established businesses.

History 

CODE_n was officially founded by GFT Technologies AG and publicly announced on September 14, 2011 at a press conference in Berlin. In its first year, the program partners included Deutsche Messe AG, Ernst & Young, Fujitsu Technology Solutions, BITKOM, and the Center for Art and Media Karlsruhe (ZKM).

2012: Shaping Mobile Life 

The motto for CODE_n in 2012 was "Shaping Mobile Life": part of a quest for young companies with business models that revolve around mobile technologies. Fifty finalists were selected from the 400 applicants from 42 countries. These finalists were invited to present their business models at CeBIT in the CODE_n trade show hall. Jürgen Mayer H. and Tobias Rehberger designed the exhibition space.

Intelligent Apps from Hamburg was selected as the winner of the CODE_n12 Award for their app called myTaxi: The jury panel included Ulrich Dietz (GFT Technologies AG*), Lars Hinrichs (HackFwd), Gabriele Fischer (brand eins), Carsten Knop (Frankfurter Allgemeine Zeitung), Paulus Neef (PQuadra), Joseph Reger (Fujitsu Technology Solutions), Jens-Uwe Sauer (Seedmatch), and Peter Weibel (ZKM).

2013: Smart Solutions for Global Challenges 

The second installment of the CODE_n innovation contest ran in 2013 under the slogan "Smart Solutions for Global Challenges". This time the contest was looking for digital business models that were geared to the transition to sustainable energy and its related challenges. The CODE_n13 Award was given in two categories: Emerging Company and Best Startup. The winners were Changers.com (Potsdam) and Greenclouds (the Netherlands).

Artist Vincent Tavenne took on the task of designing the 5,000 m2 exhibition hall at CeBIT. Attendees included Angela Merkel, Donald Tusk, Philipp Rösler and Peter Altmaier.

2014: Driving the Data Revolution 

In 2014, CODE_n focused on big data, with the slogan "Driving the Data Revolution". Again, 50 finalists were chosen, this year from among 450 applicants from 17 countries. The Code_n14 grand prize of €30,000 went to the UK-based startup Viewsy. The US-based company AutoGrid also won a special award.

Partners at CeBIT 2014 included Deutsche Messe and Ernst & Young, as well as Google, Salesforce.com, Continental AG, and Dassault Systèmes. Sigmar Gabriel, Germany's Minister for Economic Affairs and Energy, and Apple founder Steve Wozniak were among the 17,000 visitors to the CODE_n hall.

2015: Into the Internet of Things 

The fourth round of the CODE_n contest was held under the banner "Into the Internet of Things". It called for young companies with business models dedicated to the IoT. More than 450 startups applied, with the 50 finalists exhibiting in the CODE_n hall at CeBIT, from March 16–20, 2015, in Hanover. The contest featured the interactive Robochop installation designed by Munich-based designers Clemens Weisshaar and Reed Kram. This year's contest also drew in partners including Trumpf, EnBW, Salesforce, Google, EY, Kuka, and Accenture. More than 85,000 visitors attended, including Sigmar Gabriel, Germany's Minister for Economic Affairs and Energy, as well as the European Commissioner for Digital Economy and Society, Günther Oettinger.

The Berlin-based startup Relayr was selected as this year's €30,000 winner for their signature product "Wunderbar".

2016: Unveiling Digital Disruption 

The motto for the fifth round of the CODE_n CONTEST was "Unveiling Digital Disruption", with subcategories Applied FinTech, Connected Mobility, HealthTech and Photonics 4.0. For the first time, CODE_n was not held at CeBIT. Instead, CODE_n initiated the new.New Festival, revolving around digital transformation in trending modern-day industries, and held  from September 20–22 at the Center for Art and Media (ZKM) in Karlsruhe (Germany). Festival partners were Accenture, the Federal Ministry of Education and Research, Hewlett Packard Enterprise, GFT, TRUMPF, EnBW, and Vector Informatik.

Additional CODE_n elements 

The online platform CODE_n CONNECT went live in September 2014. This platform networks startups with established businesses which are working on similar development issues.

In October 2014, GFT announced that it would be opening CODE_n SPACES, an innovation campus in Stuttgart, Germany, at the start of 2015:  a place for new and older companies to work together on future digital issues, with a focus on business models geared toward mobility. Partners included EnBW Energie Baden-Württemberg.

Also beginning in 2015, CODE_n EVENTS was launched to feature events and creative workshops for startups and established companies.

Winners of the CODE_n Awards

References

External links
 Website of CODE_n

Entrepreneurship organizations